Roof Over Heaven is the 22nd novel by F. J. Thwaites.

References

External links
Roof Over Heaven at AustLit

1953 Australian novels